Dmitry Andreyevich Yefremov (born 2 June 1991) is a Russian former football midfielder.

Career
Yefremov made his professional debut for FC Tom Tomsk on 15 July 2009 in the Russian Cup game against FC Alania Vladikavkaz.

External links
 
 
 

1991 births
Living people
Russian footballers
Association football midfielders
FC Tom Tomsk players
FC Smena Komsomolsk-na-Amure players
FC Chita players